Tapeina paulista is a species of beetle in the family Cerambycidae. It was described by Marinoni in 1972. It is known from Brazil.

References

Lamiinae
Beetles described in 1972